is a passenger railway station in the town of Ōra, Gunma, Japan, operated by the private railway operator Tōbu Railway. It is numbered "TI-42".

Lines

Station layout
The station consists of two opposed side platforms, connected to the station building by a footbridge.

Platforms

Adjacent stations

History
Hon-Nakano Station was opened as a station of the Koizumi Line operated by Jōshū Railway company on March 12, 1917. The Koizumi Line was purchased by Tōbu Railway in 1937. The station was moved to its current location on June 1, 1922.

From March 17, 2012, station numbering was introduced on all Tōbu lines, with Hon-Nakano Station becoming "TI-42".

Passenger statistics
In fiscal 2019, the station was used by an average of 963 passengers daily (boarding passengers only).

Surrounding area
 Tatebayashi High School
 Ōra Town Hall
 Ōra Post Office
 Shinko-ji Temple

See also
List of railway stations in Japan

References

External links

 Tobu station information 
	

Tobu Koizumi Line
Stations of Tobu Railway
Railway stations in Gunma Prefecture
Railway stations in Japan opened in 1917
Ōra, Gunma